Hub VV Drama (formerly known as VarietyVision, officially launched on 1 April 1992 and officially dissolved on 31 May 1995) is a cable television StarHub TV on Channel 855. Its programming consists solely of drama series from Hong Kong, People's Republic of China, Republic of Korea and Republic of China, dubbed into Chinese. There are no commercial breaks during programmes. StarHub TV on channel 856 as VV Drama+3 a showing dramas they air 3-hours before at a 3-hours later timeslot.

This channel is owned by StarHub TV, alongside Astro Sensasi, Hub Sports Arena, Hub Sports and Hub E City.

This channel celebrated its 20th anniversary to new timeslots including a new Japanese drama timeslot on Friday at 22:30 SST.

Commercial breaks 
There are usually 1-minute commercial breaks in after the ending and before the beginning of each episode when 2 to 5 episodes of the same drama were broadcast back-to-back. Due to this scheme of not having commercial breaks during programmes, the show usually ends at about 45 minutes after the show has started to marks the end of the episode of each drama series, making the run of an episode faster than the typical one hour (60 minutes) including commercials.

See also
StarHub TV
List of VV Drama dramas in 2013

References

External links
   Starhub CableTV programme guide

Television stations in Singapore
Television channels and stations established in 1992